Human Cobras (also released as L'uomo più velenoso del cobra) is a 1971 Spanish-Italian giallo film directed by Bitto Albertini.

Plot
A gangster seeks revenge on the people who killed his brother.

References

External links

1971 films
Giallo films
Italian films about revenge
1971 crime films
Italian crime films
Spanish crime films
Films scored by Stelvio Cipriani
1970s Italian films
1970s Spanish films